Akinwale is a Nigerian name. Notable people with the name include:

 Akinwale Arobieke (born 1961), convicted criminal from Liverpool, United Kingdom
Ayo Akinwale (1946–2020), Nigerian actor, producer, and academician
Joseph Edet Akinwale Wey (1918–1991), Nigerian naval officer